Anam Zakaria is a Canada-based Pakistani writer, oral historian and educator. She is the author of the prize winning book The Footprints of Partition: Narratives of Four Generations of Pakistanis and Indians (2015) and 1971: A People's History from Bangladesh, Pakistan and India (2019).

Biography 
Anam Zakaria holds an undergraduate degree in International development from McGill University and a Master's degree in Anthropology from the University of Toronto.

Anam has a twelve-year career experience in the development sector. Since 2010, she has been involved with development and research work in Pakistan.

She has previously worked as a Director at the Citizens Archive of Pakistan. She conducted interviews from the partition generation of Pakistan and was part of the team leading the exchange-for-change program between 2010-2013. The program was aimed at building peace among students of Pakistan and India. Anam has also worked in the education and energy sectors at the Association for the Development of Pakistan. She has also taught at the Headstart School.

Anam is a freelance journalist and has written articles for CBC, Scroll, Al-Jazeera, The New York Times, Dawn, The Hill Times and The Wire.

Anam has authored books on South Asian history and conflicts. The Footprints of Partition: Narratives of Four Generations of Pakistanis and Indians (2015) was her first book. Since then, she has published Between the Great Divide: A Journey into Pakistan-Administered Kashmir (2018) and 1971: A People's History from Bangladesh, Pakistan and India (2019). She used her own research, including interviews and museum visits for her third book.

Between 2016-2022 she was the Head of Fellowships for the KP Government Innovation Fellowship Program, at Code for Pakistan, where she now serves as Vice President - Fellowships. The program is a partnership between the KP Government, The World Bank and Code for Pakistan.

In Canada, Anam has worked in the settlement sector to support newcomers and refugees and currently works towards inclusive city-building. She is also the co-founder of Qissa, a platform for immigrant storytelling. 

She is married to Pakistani writer Haroon Khalid.

Awards 

 Winner: 2017 KLF German Peace Prize for her book The Footprints of Partition.

Books 

 The Footprints of Partition: Narratives of Four Generations of Pakistanis and Indians (2015)
 Between the Great Divide: A Journey into Pakistan-Administered Kashmir (2018)
 1971: A People's History from Bangladesh, Pakistan and India (2019)

References 

Living people
Pakistani expatriates in Canada
21st-century Pakistani historians
Year of birth missing (living people)
Oral historians
Pakistani women historians